Boldyni Hory or Boldyni Hills  historical area in the regional center of Chernihiv (Novozavodskyi district) on the right bank of the Desna, as well as a monument of landscape art (since 1972). Boldyni Hory are located two kilometers from the historic center of Chernihiv. From the center of Chernihiv one can walk or take public transport to Tolstoy street. The monuments are formed from 20 to 35-meter hills developed by an arc south of the floodplain of the Stryzhen River. The area has long been inhabited, many archeological, historical and architectural monuments have been preserved on its territory.

Name
There are several versions of what Boldyni calls:
 formed from the ancient Slavic word bold, meaning "oak". – but no dictionary contains the word bold, which is so translated.
 The high hill on the right bank of the Desna was chosen by our ancestors as a place for a necropolis;
 according to one theoretical name it is called Turkism, and is formed from balda / balta "ax".

Description and history
Located on the Boldyni Hills on an area of 1.2 hectares, the mound complex is one of the largest known to science in Ukraine necropolises of the IX-XI centuries – consists of 6 mound groups (a total of about 230 mounds have survived), which defined the populated area. One of the largest – the mound "Gulbyshche" is located in the northeastern part of the necropolis, has a height of 6 m (in ancient times 8.5 m), diameter – 22 m, and the mound "Nameless", which according to Professor Boris Rybakov belongs to 1 half of the X century. The mounds of the Boldy Mountains were studied in 1872 and 1908 by D. Ya. Samokvasov, and in 1965 by SS Shirinsky.

In the middle of the 11th century, the monk Anthony the Reverend came to Boldyna Hill and founded earthen structures, the so-called Saint Anthony Caves. They are connected by underground passages with the Church of St. Elijah, which was built in the XII century. In 1654, a colleague of Hetman Bohdan Khmelnytsky, Colonel Stefan Podobail of Chernihiv, was buried in the Saint Anthony Caves.

The landmark of the architectural ensemble of the Trinity-Elijah Monastery – Trinity Monastery was built in the late XVII century. In 1667, a tenement house was built on the site of the eastern gate of the monastery for the printing house of the Trinity-Elijah Monastery.

In the tomb of the Trinity Cathedral among the Chernihiv bishops is the body of the author of a multi-volume historical and statistical description of the Chernihiv diocese Filaret (Gumilevsky), in the west wing of the church – at rest the general, participant in the Russo-Turkish war of 1877–78, historian and public figure, chairman of Chernihiv archival commission Hryhoriy Myloradovych. Not far from the cathedral under the green crowns stands a chapel in which is buried a prominent Russian diplomat, a native of Chernihiv Grigory Shcherbin.

Next to the monastery is a cemetery where prominent Ukrainians are buried (their graves have been preserved) – Ukrainian biker and lyre player Leonid Glibov; famous Ukrainian writer Mykhailo Kotsiubynsky (and his relatives – wife Vira Ustymivna, mother Glykeriya Maksymovna, sister Lidia Mykhailivna); Ukrainian folklorist and ethnographer Opanas Markevych, husband of the writer Marko Vovchok; writer and public figure Mykola Verbytsky.

On the eve of Victory Day, May 8, 1986, a memorial of Glory was unveiled in the lower reaches of the Boldy Mountains. Four majestic figures froze on the granite pedestal in bronze: an ancient Russian warrior in a helmet with a sword and spear and a shield depicting the ancient coat of arms of Chernihiv, a soldier of World War II, a national avenger and a working woman. Along with 5 granite stelae, bronze bas-reliefs reflect the labor, heroic and victorious history of the Chernihiv region: the march on Prince Igor Svyatoslavovich's Polovtsians, heroic episodes of the period of the so-called "Great October", civil and World War II, and guerrilla warfare. . At present, Boldyni Hory is a monument of garden and park art "Boldyna Hora", as well as a valuable historical and architectural complex, a significant tourist attraction of the city and region.

See also 
 Glory Memorial
 Obelisk and Eternal Flame
 Boldyni Hory park
 Saint Anthony Caves
 Trinity Cathedral Monastery
 Stant Elias Monastery
 Yeletsky Assumption Monastery

Gallery

References

External links 
 wikimapia.org

Tourist attractions in Chernihiv
Tourist attractions in Chernihiv Oblast
Buildings and structures in Chernihiv
Monuments and memorials in Ukraine
Monuments and memorials in Chernihiv
Tourism in Chernihiv